The silverside shiner ('Notropis candidus'') is a species of cyprinid fish. It is endemic to the southern United States and occurs in the Mobile Basin in Alabama and Mississippi. It occurs in sand-gravel runs of medium to large rivers. It lives in small schools, escaping to deeper water when disturbed. It grows to  total length, although is commonly only half of that size.

References 

Notropis
Freshwater fish of the United States
Endemic fauna of the United States
Fish described in 1980